Amelia Todhunter (born 21 May 1988) is an Australian professional basketball player.

Professional career

WNBL
Todhunter began her professional career in 2007, for the Dandenong Rangers. She would then move to the Bulleen Boomers and help the team win their first ever championship in the 2011 Grand Final. After a brief stint in the west, she returned to Victoria to suit up for the rebranded Melbourne Boomers. After two seasons with the Boomers, she returned to her roots, rejoining the Dandenong Rangers. Todhunter was resigned for the 2016–17 season, her second consecutive season with the Rangers and fifth overall.

In 2020, Todhunter returned to the league after a one year absence, signing with the Bendigo Spirit for the 2020–21 season. 

In addition to her illustrious 246 WNBL games, Amelia has also spent 15+ years of her professional career competing in Australia’s second tier competition (SEABL / NBL1) which sees her currently the co-captain with the Waverly Falcons for the 2023 NBL1 season.

References

External links 
Profile at WNBL

1988 births
Living people
Australian women's basketball players
Guards (basketball)
Sportspeople from Albury
Basketball players from New South Wales
20th-century Australian women
21st-century Australian women